Chathuranga or Chaturanga is a Sinhalese name that may refer to the following people:
 
Surname
Milinda Chathuranga (born 1991), Sri Lankan kabaddi player
Pubudu Chathuranga (born 1982), Sri Lankan actor
Ruwan Chathuranga (born 1989), Sri Lankan cricketer
Sanjaya Chathuranga (born 1992), Sri Lankan cricketer
Sanka Chathuranga (born 1996), Sri Lankan cricketer
Vishva Chathuranga (born 1998), Sri Lankan cricketer
 
Forename
Chaturanga de Silva (1990), Sri Lankan cricketer
Chathuranga Dikkumbura (born 1990), Sri Lankan cricketer
Chathuranga Kodithuwakku (born 1995), Sri Lankan actor
Chathuranga Kumara (born 1992), Sri Lankan cricketer
Chaturanga Lakmal (born 1988), Sri Lankan weightlifter
Chathuranga Sanjeewa (born 1991), Sri Lankan soccer player
Chathuranga Silva (born 1993), Sri Lankan cricketer

See also
Chathuranga Vallabhanathar Temple, Hindu temple in Tamil Nadu, India
Chaturanga (disambiguation)

Sinhalese masculine given names
Sinhalese surnames